Phlox oklahomensis, the Oklahoma phlox, is a species of flowering plant in the family Polemoniaceae. It can be found in the prairies of Kansas, Oklahoma and Texas.

References

oklahomensis
Flora of the Great Plains (North America)